Linda Viera Caballero (born March 9, 1969), better known as La India, is a Puerto Rican singer and songwriter of salsa, house music and Latin pop. La India has been nominated for both Grammy and Latin Grammy Awards, winning the Latin Grammy Award for Best Salsa Album for the Intensamente La India Con Canciones De Juan Gabriel album.

Early life 
Caballero was born in Río Piedras, Puerto Rico. Both her parents moved to New York City soon after her birth, settling in the South Bronx area of the city. Initially, they lived with Caballero's grandmother, a woman who served as an important influence on Caballero's life. Caballero began singing as a young girl, even taking opera training for a brief time. Her stage name, La India, was given to her by her grandmother because of her dark features and long, straight, black hair. La India describes herself as a feminist, having watched her father abuse her mother while she hid under the bed.

Career

1985: Early career
In 1985, when Caballero was 16 years old, she joined the Latin freestyle group TKA, a fact not widely known. Credited as "Linda," she appeared in the group photo on the back cover of TKA's second single, "Come Get My Love." She left shortly thereafter.

Caballero signed a record contract with Reprise/Warner Bros. Records, who planned to market her as the Latin version of Madonna (who recorded for sister label Sire Records). India's debut album was titled Breaking Night.  Three singles were released (“Dancing on the Fire,” “Right from the Start,” and “The Lover Who Rocks You All Night”), which all became big hits in the dance clubs. She also added her vocals to the Jellybean-produced single "Mirage".  After recording the album, Caballero decided that she didn't want to take that route in her career. She decided to switch to salsa because she believed that she needed to "cross over to [her] people."

1992–1994: First salsa album 
An important event took place when she accompanied her husband "Little" Louie Vega to a studio session. Salsa bandleader Eddie Palmieri happened to visit the studio, and was impressed with Caballero when he heard her singing. In 1992, Palmieri produced Caballero's first Spanish-language salsa album Llego La India via Eddie Palmieri (The India has Arrived via Eddie Palmieri), which was acclaimed as one of the best salsa albums of the year. From then on, Caballero became known to all as La India. India received a Lo Nuestro Award nomination in 1993 for Best Female Performer, Tropical/Salsa.

In 1994 La India, together with Louie Vega, recorded the house-music single "Love and Happiness" (Yemaya y Ochún), which paid tribute to Santería (a syncretic religion based in the Caribbean). This up-beat track was played heavily in dance clubs internationally. La India's involvement with Santería drew much criticism. Sergio George produced La India's 1994 album Dicen Que Soy, a 2× gold-certified Billboard hit that added to her legend in the Latin-American music realm.  The album also included the song "Vivir Lo Nuestro," a duet with Marc Anthony. Later this same year, Combinación Perfecta was released.

1996–present: La India, the Princess of Salsa 

In 1996, La India worked with Tito Puente on Jazzin, an English-language album of swing classics with a Latin twist, on RMM Records. That same year she contributed the song "Banderas" to the album titled Voces Unidas (United Voices), a multi-artist tribute to the 1996 Summer Olympics. She also released India: Mega Mix that same year before divorcing Vega. La India sang a duet titled "La Voz de la Experiencia" (The Voice of Experience) with Celia Cruz, the late Queen of Salsa. It was then that Cruz gave Caballero her longer name: La India, the Princess of Salsa. In 1997, La India recorded "Sobre el Fuego" (Over the Fire) with Puerto Rican salsa singer Kevin Ceballo as backup vocalist. The song was nominated for Best Latin Tropical Performance Grammy Award. In 1998, she won an ACE Award.

On May 31, 1998, La India performed two sold-out concerts at the Luis A. Ferre Performing Arts Center in San Juan, Puerto Rico. She returned to the United States, and television network UPN aired one of her shows. With training provided by New York's famed choreographer Sara D'Arce India was also able to perform concerts in New York's Madison Square Garden and in El Festival de la Calle Ocho in Miami, Florida. In September 1999, La India released her album Sola, which earned positive reviews for the single Sola and for covers of two hits by the late Cuban sensation La Lupe, Que Te Pedi and Si Vuelves Tu.

On February 5, 2000, a full-page ad in Billboard Magazine congratulated La India for her second Grammy Award nomination. In March 2000, she was featured in Vibe Magazine. On November 26, 2003, La India released Latin Songbird: Mi Alma y Corazón. The album's lead single "Sedúceme" became a hit on the Latin charts, and topped the U.S. Billboard Hot Latin Tracks for several weeks. This romantic salsa hit single was La India's first number-one song. Latin Songbird brought her a new fan base with many awards and nominations, including two Latin Grammy nominations for Best Salsa Album and Best Tropical Song in 2003, and her third Grammy Award nomination for Best Salsa Album in 2004.

In 2005, La India participated in the musical presentation Selena ¡VIVE!, a tribute to the late Tejano sensation Selena Quintanilla-Perez. In 2006, La India released the album Soy Diferente, which contained two songs that became award-winning hits. The 2007 Annual Latin Billboard Awards honored La India with Best Tropical Album of the Year Female for "Soy Diferente" (I Am Different), and Latin Dance Club Play Track of the Year for "Solamente Una Noche" (Just for One Night). In 2007, La India collaborated with Latin sensation Gloria Estefan in a duet titled "90 Millas."

On June 11, 2006, La India was honored by Union City, New Jersey with a star on the Walk of Fame at Union City's Celia Cruz Park.

La India released her ninth studio album in 2010. La India mentioned to the Associated Press, "I am reinventing myself ... changing my physical image. La India will return to become a Barbie. But more than that, I feel like a new woman because I have been blessed with many beautiful things. After many years, I have my family with me, and I am not separated from my mother, in which I suffered greatly. I have her in my life, and that brings inner peace that I haven't had in a long time."

On February 23, 2010, La India's hit single "Estupida" was released on iTunes. The single was a cover of the 2009 Italian version "Stupida" by Alessandra Amoroso. La India's ninth studio album, Unica, was released June 1, 2010.

In 2011, La India continued to release new music. She performed a duet with Issac Delgado titled "Que No Se Te Olvide." In 2011, La India released a new house track titled "Tacalacateo," on which she worked with Italian DJ Peppe Citarella. "Tacalacateo" peaked at #13 on Billboard's dance music chart.

In 2012, La India performed as part of UNITY : The Latin Tribute to Michael Jackson, along with other Latin artists such as Tito Nieves and Kevin Ceballo.

In 2014, La India once again signed with the record label Top Stop Music, also joining the Salsa Giants project with Sergio George. La India released her tenth studio salsa album "Intensamente Con Canciones de Juan Gabriel" on Top Stop Music in 2015. It includes duets and solo pieces by both artists. This album was number one on Billboard's tropical chart for a consecutive four weeks. One song in particular, "Ahora Que Te Vas" quickly rose to number one on Billboard's tropical chart. With this song, La India became the Latino woman with the most-ever number ones, a record previously held by Gloria Estefan.

Discography

Studio albums

Compilation albums

EPs

Contributions on other recordings 
 1988 - Mirage
By Jellybean & Little Louie Vega (Featured on the "B" side of the 12" Single of 'Just A Mirage')
With Tony Humphries
 Keith Thompson – Rhythm of Life
With Masters at Work
 1992 – Ride On The Rhythm by Louie Vega & Marc Anthony (wrote/background vocals)
 1993 – When You Touch Me and I Can't Get No Sleep (from The Album)
 1994 – Voices In My Mind by Voices (India, Carol Sylvan, Michael Watford)
 1994 – Vibe P.M. (Masters at Work Remix) (featured with Mondo Grosso)
 1998 – To Be In Love (MAW Remix) (from MAW Records: The Collection Volume I)
 1998 – Runaway (from Nuyorican Soul)
 2002 – Backfired (from Our Time Is Coming)
RMM Combinacion Perfecta
 1994 – Vivir Lo Nuestro (duet with Marc Anthony)
 Li'l Mo Ying Yang
 1995 Reach (samples "Love & Happiness")
Voces Unidas: The Atlanta Olympics
 1996 – Banderas
 JohNick – Play The World EP
 1996 – Play The World (samples "Love & Happiness")
With Oscar D'León
 1997 – Hazme El Amor (from En Nueva York)
 Puff Daddy & the Family – No Way Out
 1997 – Senorita (samples India's "No Me Conviene")
The Last Days of Disco Original Motion Picture Soundtrack
 1998 – I Love the Nightlife (Disco Round)
The 24-Hour Woman Original Motion Picture Soundtrack
 1999 – India Con La Voe (Viva Puerto Rico)
Haus-A-Holics – Latin Spice EP
 2001 – Que Pasa by Haus-A-Holics (samples "Oye Como Va" with Tito Puente Jr.)
Empire Original Motion Picture Soundtrack
 2003 – Empire, Imperio
With Tito Nieves, Nicky Jam, and K-Mil
 2004 – Ya No Queda Nada
With Ivy Queen
 2004 – "Tócame" (from Real)
Tribute to Selena
 2005 – No Debes Jugar (from Selena ¡VIVE!)
With Marlon Fernández
 2006 – Usted Abusó (from Mi Sueño)
With R.K.M & Ken-Y, Polaco, Nicky Jam, and Carlitos Way
 2006 – Tocarte Toda
With Gloria Estefan
 2007–90 Millas (from 90 Millas)
With Michael Stuart
 2007 – Un Amor Tan Grande (from Sentimiento De Un Rumbero)
With Yolandita Monge
 2008 – Mala (Tropical Remix) (from "Mala")
With Tito "El Bambino"
 2009 – El Amor (Salsa Remix) (from "El Patron")
' 2010 – "Un Verano En Nueva York" (from Banco Popular De PR – Salsa, Un Homenaje A El Gran Combo Album)
With Issac Delgado
 2011 – Maxi single "Que No Se Te Olvide"
With Peppe Citarella
 2011 – Maxi single "Tacalacateo"
With Tito Rojas
 2011 – "Maldito y Bendito Amor" (Salsa version)
 2011 – "Maldito y Bendito Amor" (Ballad version)
' 2013 – "Tu no tienes alma" (from the "Y Si Fueran Ellas" albuml)
With Sergio George's Salsa Giants
 2014 – "Bajo La Tormenta" (from Sergio George Presents: Salsa Giants Plus)
With Tony Succar – Unity the Latin Tribute to Michael Jackson
 2015 – "Earth song"

Awards and nominations

Latin Grammy 

|-
| 2016
| Intensamente con Canciones de Juan Gabriel
| Best Salsa Album
| 
|-

Latin American Music Awards of 2016 

|-
| 2016
| Intensamente con Canciones de Juan Gabriel
| Favorite Album—Tropical
| 
|-

Lo Nuestro Awards 

|-
| 2004
| La India (herself)
| Tropical Female Artist
| 
|-
| 2004
| La India (herself)
| Best Salsa Performance
| 
|-
| 2004
| Seduceme
| Best Tropical Song
| 
|-
| 2004
| Mi Alma Y Corazon
| Best Tropical Album
| 
|-
| 2005
| La India (herself)
| Female Artist Of The Year
| 
|-
| 2007
| Soy Diferente
| Best Tropical Album
| 
|-
| 2007
| La India (herself)
| Female Artist Of The Year
| 
|-
| 2007
| La India & Cheka
| Group Or Duo Of The Year
| 
|-
| 2011
| La India (herself)
| Female Artist Of The Year
| 
|-
| 2011
| Estupida
| Best Tropical Song
| 
|-
| 2016
| La India (herself)
| Female Artist Of The Year
| 
|-

Billboard Latin Music Awards 

|-
| 2003
| Latin Songbird: Mi Alma Y Corazon
| Tropical Album Of The Year
| 
|-
| 2004
| La India (Herself)
| Seduceme (Remix)
| 
|-
| 2006
| Grandes Exitos
| Tropical Album Of The Year
| 
|-
| 2007
| Soy Diferente
| Tropical Album Of The Year
| 
|-
| 2007
| Pura Salsa
| Tropical Album Of The Year
| 
|-

See also
 List of Puerto Ricans
 Nuyorican
 Puerto Ricans in New York City

References

External links

 

1969 births
Living people
Singers from San Juan, Puerto Rico
American freestyle musicians
20th-century American women singers
20th-century American singers
Reprise Records artists
RMM Records artists
Salsa musicians
People from Río Piedras, Puerto Rico
Sony Discos artists
Universal Music Latino artists
Top Stop Music artists
Latin Grammy Award winners
21st-century American women singers
21st-century American singers
Women in Latin music
Puerto Rican feminists
Feminist musicians